Tory Camp Run is a stream in the U.S. state of West Virginia.

Tory Camp Run was named after the Tories from the time of the American Revolution.

See also
List of rivers of West Virginia

References

Rivers of Randolph County, West Virginia
Rivers of West Virginia